Keeley Sherar is an Australian rules footballer playing for the Carlton Football Club in the AFL Women's (AFLW). Sherar was recruited by Carlton with the 11th pick in the 2021 AFL Women's draft.

AFL Women's career
Sherar debuted for the Blues in the third round of the 2022 AFL Women's season. On debut, she collected 5 disposals. The following round, she earned herself a rising star nomination after collecting 19 disposals and 4 score involvements against , her performance also earning her coaches votes. After suffering a broken hand, she missed the next two matches to return in round 7.

Statistics
Updated to the end of S7 (2022).

|-
| 2022 ||  || 25
| 6 || 2 || 1 || 43 || 24 || 67 || 12 || 21 || 0.3 || 0.2 || 7.2 || 4.0 || 11.2 || 2.0 || 3.5 || 0
|-
| S7 (2022) ||  || 25
| 10 || 0 || 0 || 56 || 46 || 102 || 15 || 40 || 0.0 || 0.0 || 5.6 || 4.6 || 10.2 || 1.5 || 4.0 || 
|- class=sortbottom
! colspan=3 | Career
! GA !! 2 !! 1 !! 99 !! 70 !! 169 !! 27 !! 61 !! 0.1 !! 0.1 !! 6.2 !! 4.4 !! 10.6 !! 1.7 !! 3.8 !! 0
|}

Honours and achievements
 AFL Women's Rising Star nominee: 2022

References

External links
 Keeley Sherar at AustralianFootball.com

2003 births
Living people
Carlton Football Club (AFLW) players
Australian rules footballers from Victoria (Australia)